Accomack County Public Schools is a school district headquartered in Accomac, Virginia, serving Accomack County, Virginia. The district is led by Warren "Chris" Holland.

Schools
The schools in this district are:

Elementary schools 
Accawmacke Elementary School
Chincoteague Elementary School
Kegotank Elementary School
Metompkin Elementary School
Pungoteague Elementary School

Middle schools 
Arcadia Middle School
Nandua Middle School

High schools 
Arcadia High School
Chincoteague High School
Nandua High School

K-12 schools 
Tangier Combined School

Other 
Badger Technical Center

References

External links
 Accomack County Public Schools
 

School divisions in Virginia
Education in Accomack County, Virginia